Hisonotus brunneus is a species of catfish in the family Loricariidae. It is native to South America, where it occurs in the Jacuí River and Lagoa dos Patos drainage basins in Brazil. The species reaches 4.2 cm (1.7 inches) SL.

Hisonotus brunneus was described in 2011 by Tiago P. Carvalho (of the Pontifical Xavierian University) and Roberto E. Reis (of the Pontifical Catholic University of Rio Grande do Sul) as part of a taxonomic review of Hisonotus species in the Lagoa dos Patos system, alongside five other species: H. heterogaster, H. notopagos, H. vireo, H. carreiro, and H. prata. The type locality of H. brunneus is stated to be the Passo Novo River near the municipality of Cruz Alta in the Brazilian state of Rio Grande do Sul.

References 

Otothyrinae
Fish described in 2011